Song Yuxi (1918–2000) was a People's Republic of China politician. He was born in Lincheng County, Hebei. He was CPPCC Chairman of Henan. He was a delegate to the 7th National People's Congress.

1918 births
2000 deaths
People's Republic of China politicians from Hebei
Chinese Communist Party politicians from Hebei
People from Lincheng County
Delegates to the 7th National People's Congress
Members of the 6th Chinese People's Political Consultative Conference
CPPCC Chairmen of Henan